Carrickfergus Borough Council was a district council in County Antrim in Northern Ireland. It merged with Ballymena Borough Council and Larne Borough Council in May 2015 under local government reorganisation in Northern Ireland to become Mid and East Antrim Borough Council.

The council was based at Carrickfergus Town Hall and the council administered the town, on the north shore of Belfast Lough, and surrounding area, which extended from Greenisland in the south-west to Whitehead in the east.

Together with the neighbouring district of Larne and small parts of Newtownabbey and Moyle, it formed the East Antrim constituency for elections to the Westminster Parliament and Northern Ireland Assembly.

Mayors of Carrickfergus

List of mayors and sheriffs of Carrickfergus Corporation from 1523 to the passing of The Municipal Corporations (Ireland) Act 1840

Henry VIII
1523 William Fythe Thomas Unchile, Henry Fythe} These are called Bayliffs
Elizabeth I
1568–1569 Thomas Stephenson John Teade, Nicholas Wilis
1569–1570 John Teade Nicholas Rogers, John Flude
1570–1571 Rychard Sendall Wolston Elderton, Cornell O'Kane
1571–1572 Edward Brown William Dobbin, Patrick Savadge, Junior
1572–1573 Captain William Piers Wolston Elderton, John Dyer
1573–1574 Thomas Stephenson Gregory Grafton, William Field, Senior
1574–1575 William Piers, Junior Humphrey Potts, John Cockrill
1575–1576 William Piers, Junior John Cockrill, John Dishford
1576–1577 William Dobbin John Dyer, John Dishford
1577–1578 William Piers, Junior Robert Magye, Robert Warcope
1578–1579 Nicholas Wills Humphrey Johnston, Mychaell Savadge
1579–1580 Captain Thomas Sackforde Barnabic Ward, Thomas Stephenson
1580–1581 William Dobbin Humphrey Johnston, John Dyer
1581–1582 Captain Thomas Sackforde and Nicholas Wills John Savadge, Phellimy Magye
1582–1583 Captain William Piers John Dishford, James Dobbin
1583–1584 William Dobbin John Dyer, Rychard Thomas
1584–1585 Captain Nicholas Dawtrey Mathew Jones, John Scully
1585–1586 William Dobbin John Dishford, Mychael Savadge
1586–1587 Thomas Stephenson Humphrey Johnston, John Scully
1587–1588 John Savadge John Dyer, James Dobbin
1588–1589 William Dobbin Thomas Vaughan, John Lugg
1589–1590 Charles Eggerton James Dobbin, Roger Cooper
1590–1591 Matthew Jones William Savadge, Henrie Ockforde} John Dyer, dep
1591–1592 Humphrey Johnston Moyses Hill, Roger Cooper
1592–1593 John Dallwaye Alexander Haynes, James Dobbin
1593–1594 Nicholas Wills and M. Savadge John Hooper, James Rice
1594–1595 John Savadge Robert Wills died, John Dyer, Richard Thomas
1595–1596 Thomas Stephenson Roger Cooper, Rychard Conlon
1596–1597 Charles Eggerton Thomas Vaughan, Thomas Wytter
1597–1598 Humphrey Johnston Rychard Thomas died, Henry Ockford, Thomas Gravott
1598–1599 John Savadge Rychard Newton, Owen Magye
1599–1600 Humphrey Johnston Henrie Spearpointe, Sydney Russel
1600–1601 John Dallwaye Rychard Newton, Rychard Faythe
1601–1602 Gregorie Norton Rychard Newton, Rychard Faythe
James I
1602–1603 John Hooper Mychaell Whyte, Ralph Storie died, Thomas Gravott
1603–1604 Moyses Hill Dudley Yearworth, Robert Lyndon
1604–1605 John Savadge Thomas Wytter, Clement Foard
1605–1606 James Byrte Thomas M'Manus, Thomas Cooper
1606–1607 James Byrte, Thomas Wytter, deputy Owen Magye, Leonard Gale
1607–1608 Thomas Wytter Nicholas Dobbin, Dermot Haynes
1608–1609 Sir Foulke Conway Robert Elice, Walter Hilman
1609–1610 Sir Foulke Conway Jasper Happer, Thomas Powell
1610–1611 Rychard Tanffe Bartholomewe Johnston, Rychard Wytter
1611–1612 Mychaell Whyte William Hurley, Edward Hodgsone
1612–1613 Robert Lyndon Thomas Bashford, Ezechiel Davis
1613–1614 Thomas Cooper William Dobbin dismissed, Carew Hart
1614–1615 Captain Hercules Langford William Stephenson, Clement Foard
1615–1616 Humphrey Johnston Thomas M'Manus, Thomas Papes
1616–1617 Captain Humphrey Norton William Hurley, Thomas Kirkpatrick
1617–1618 Sir Moyses Hill Matthewe Johnston, John Redworth
1618–1619 Thomas Witter and Mychaell Whyte Nicholas Dobbin, Cornell O'Kane
1619–1620 Sir Hugh Clotworthy Edward Wilkinson, Edward Hodgsone
1620–1621 James Byrte Inghram Horsman, Cornell O'Kane
1621–1622 Thomas Cooper James Savadge died, William Story
1622–1623 Mychael Whyte and William Storr Robert Savadge, John Davis
1623–1624 Sir Hercules Langford Rychard Spearpoynte, William Cloughe
1624–1625 Sir Hercules Langford Marmaduke Newton, Edwarde Mason
Charles I
1625–1626 Thomas Kirkpatrick Edwarde Hodgsone, Andrewe Dixon
1626–1627 Anthony Dobbin Cornelius Hermans, John Howsell
1627–1628 Inghrame Horsman and Mathewe Johnston Thomas Richison, Ralph Kilman
1628–1629 Mathewe Johnston Thomas Turner, John Edgar
1629–1630 Sir Moyses Hill William Penrie, William Cankarth
1630–1631 James Byrte Thomas Whitager, Anthony Haull
1631–1632 Sir Hercules Langford Joshua Wharton, Clement Bashford
1632–1633 Cornelius Hermans and Mathewe Johnston Rychard Spearpoynte, Marmaduke Newton
1633–1634 Thomas Kirkpatrick John Davies, John Parkes
1634–1635 William Penrye William Happer, William Ayshworth
1635–1636 Thomas Whitager Thomas Gravott, William Bashforde
1636–1637 Richard Spearpoynt Thomas Richison, William Williams
1637–1638 Richard Spearpoynt Edward Johnston, John Hall
1638–1639 Roger Lyndon William Happer, William Penrie, Junior
1639–1640 Sir Roger Langford Thomas Gravott, Humphrey Johnston
1640–1641 John Davies Robert Savadge, George Happer
1641–1642 John Davies T. Baker, Mychaell Savadge
1642–1643 Captain Roger Lyndone John Bullworthy, William Bashforde
1643–1644 Captain Roger Lyndone Patrick Fitzjames Savadge
1644–1645 Thomas Kirkpatrick Patrick Fitz-James Savadge, James F. N. Dobbin
1645–1646 Mathewe Johnston John Savadge, William Bashforde
1646–1647 Richard Spearpoynt Thomas Tennison, John Orpin
1647–1648 Richard Spearpoynt John Boyd, James Dobbin
1648–1649 Captain Roger Lyndone John Boyd, James Dobbin
1649–1650 William Happer William Cathcart, John Orpin
1650–1651 William Happer James Crooks, Robert Welsh
1651–1652 Captain Roger Lyndone Rowland M'Quillan, Edmond Davies
1652–1653 Captain John Dallway Thomas Dobbin, John Bullworthy, Junior
1653–1654 Captain Roger Lyndone Anthony Hall, Rowland M'Quillan
1654–1655 John Bullworthy John Hall, John Birte
1655–1656 John Bullworthy Peter Taylour, Thomas Dobbin
Charles II
1656–1657 John Orpin Robert Wytter, William Dobbin
1657–1658 John Orpin Thomas Griffeth, Andrew Gardner
1658–1659 Joseph Harris Jasper Haper, John Wadman
1659–1660 John Davies Samuel Trecherne, William Thomson
1660–1661 John Dallway, Esq Michaell Kerr, Richard Johnston
1661–1662 Captain John Dallway Thomas Dobbin, Rowland M'Quillan
1662–1663 James Dobbin William Thomson, Rowland M'Quillan
1663–1664 Hercules Davies Thomas Dobbin, Rowland M'Quillan
1664–1665 John Dallway, Esq Rowland M'Quillan Thomas Dobbin
1665–1666 Anthony Hall Richard Johnston, John Magee
1666–1667 William Dobbin Cornelius Bashforde, Richard Westbrook
1667–1668 Edmond Davies Henry Burnes, Ezekiel Davies
1668–1669 Robert Welsh Richard Pendleton, William Hilditch
1669–1670 Anthony Horsman Samuel Trehecue, John Stubbs
1670–1671 Anthony Horsman John Henderson, Symon Richardson
1671–1672 Richard Dobbs Symon Richardson, William Bennett
1672–1673 Henry Davies and Edmond Davies, dep Thomas M'Manus, John Smyth
1673–1674 William Hill and Anthony Horsman, dep James M'Cullogh, John Davies
1674–1675 William Hill and Anthony Horsman, dep George Walsh, Edward Hall
1675–1676 John Byrte Thomas Harper, Adam Dennison
1676–1677 John Byrte John Smyth, John Tyso
1677–1678 Soloman Faith James M'Cullogh, William Dawson
1678–1679 Ezekell Davies Robert Williams, Cornelius Bashford
1679–1680 Hercules Davies Richard Pendleton, John Magee
1680–1681 Henry Clements Andrew Clements, John Byrtt
1681–1682 Samuel Webby John Dobbin, Henry Burnes
1682–1683 Richard Dobbs John Davies, William Johnston
1683–1684 Andrew Willoughby John Kerr, Edward Hall
James II
1684–1685 Edmond Davies Symon Richison, John Henderson
1685–1686 Author Earl of Donegall and Soloman Faith, dep James M'Cullogh, John Kerr
1686–1687 John Davies John M'Cullogh, Richard Kane
1687–1688 Richard Dobbs Richard Horsman, Marmaduke Newton
1688–1689 Richard Dobbs Richard Horsman, Marmaduke Newton
William and Mary
1689–1690 Richard Dobbs Richard Horsman, Marmaduke Newton
1690–1691 Henry Davys Samuel Davys, William Tisdall
1691–1692 Andrew Clements Soloman Bashford, John Brown
1692–1693 Marmaduke Newton David Hood, John M'Cully
1693–1694 Marmaduke Newton William Dawson, James Erwin
1694–1695 Richard Horsman William Tisdall, Cornelius Crymble,
1695–1696 Samuel Davys Robert Williams, Cornelius Bashford
1696–1697 Henry Clements and Samuel Davys Roger Horseman, Soloman Bashford
1697–1698 Hon. John E. Chichester David Hood, James Erwin
1698–1699 Henry Davys Captain Arthur Davys, Captain John Davys
1699–1700 Sir Thomas Dancer John Chaplin, Captain James Gibbons
1700–1701 Cornelius Crymble Soloman Bashford, James Erwin
1701–1702 Captain John Davys and Samuel Davys, dep John Bashford, Nathaniel Byrtte
1702–1703 Andrew Clements and Samuel Davys, dep David Hood, Thomas Bashford
1703–1704 Andrew Clements and Cornelius Crymble, dep David Hood, Thomas Bashford
1704–1705 Edward Clements John Chaplin, Thomas Bashford
1705–1706 Edward Clements John Chaplin, Thomas Bashford
1706–1707 Richard Horsman Thomas Young, Nicholas Brown
1707–1708 Richard Horsman Thomas Young, Nicholas Brown
1708–1709 Cornelius Crymble John Bashford, Thomas Bashford
1709–1710 Cornelius Crymble John Bashford, Thomas Bashford
1710–1711 Edward Clements Thomas Young, William Bashford
1711–1712 John Chaplin Rigby Dobbin, Nicholas Brown
1712–1713 Samuel Davys Charles Howard, James Wilson
1713–1714 Samuel Davys Ezekiel Davys Wilson, John Brown, Junior
George I
1714–1715 John Davys, Jun and Samuel Davys, dep Thomas Young, Thomas Bashford
1715–1716 Andrew Clements and Samuel Davys, dep Rigby Dobbin, Nicholas Brown
1716–1717 Francis Ellis David Morrison, William Bashford
1717–1718 Francis Ellis David Morrison, William Spencer
1718–1719 John Chaplin Rigby Dobbin, Andrew Newton
1719–1720 Francis Clements and Francis Ellis, dep David Morrison, William Bashford
1720–1721 Arthur Dobbs and Francis Ellis, dep David Morrison, William Magee
1721–1722 John Lyndon and John Chaplin, dep William Bashford, James Erwin
1722–1723 Ezekiel Davys Wilson David Morrison, Thomas Bashford
1723–1724 Anthony Horsman David Morrison, Thomas Bashford
1724–1725 Rigby Dobbin John Chaplin and Anthony Horsman, deputies David Morrison, Thomas Bashford
1725–1726 Valentine Jones and Ezekiel D. Wilson, dep Willoughby Chaplin, Nathaniel Byrt
1726–1727 Francis Ellis David Morrison, John Coleman
George II
1727–1728 Francis Clements John Chaplin, George Spaight
1728–1729 Arthur Dobbs and Francis Clements, dep Nathaniel Byrt, William Magee
1729–1730 Francis Lord Conway and Francis Clements, dep Henry Gill, George Spaight
1730–1731 John Lyndon and Francis Clements, dep Willoughby Chaplin, Nathaniel Byrt
1731–1732 Francis Ellis and Francis Clements, dep David Morrison, Clements Courtney
1732–1733 Arthur Dobbs and George Spaight, dep John Chaplin, Clements Courtney
1733–1734 Willoughby Chaplin John Chaplin, Nathaniel Byrt
1734–1735 George Spaight Clements Courtney, John Coleman
1735–1736 Willoughby Chaplin Clements Courtney, John Coleman
1736–1737 Francis Ellis Nathaniel Byrt, John Coleman
1737–1738 Henry Ellis Nathaniel Byrt, John Coleman
1738–1739 George Spaight Nathaniel Byrt, Hercules Clements
1739–1740 Henry Gill Richard Chaplin, John Seeds
1740–1741 Francis Clements and George Spaight, dep John Davys, John Seeds
1741–1742 Arthur Dobbs Nathaniel Byrt, Richard Chaplin
1742–1743 Willoughby Chaplin Davys Wilson, Richard Chaplin
1743–1744 Willoughby Chaplin Edward Jones, Davys Wilson
1744–1745 Willoughby Chaplin Edward Jones, Davys Wilson
1745–1746 Willoughby Chaplin Richard Chaplin, Nathaniel Byrt
1746–1747 Willoughby Chaplin William Macartney, Nathaniel Byrt
1747–1748 Willoughby Chaplin Richard Chaplin, Davys Wilson
1748–1749 Edward Brice Edward Jones, William Macartney
1749–1750 Willoughby Chaplin Richard Chaplin, John Seeds
1750–1751 Willoughby Chaplin Richard Chaplin, John Seeds
1751–1752 Willoughby Chaplin Richard Chaplin, John Seeds
1752–1753 Willoughby Chaplin Richard Chaplin, Ezekiel Wilson
1753–1754 Valentine Jones and Willoughby Chaplin John Seeds, Ezekiel Wilson
1754–1755 Henry Ellis John Seeds, Ezekiel Wilson
1755–1756 Henry Ellis John Seeds, Ezekiel Wilson
1756–1757 Henry Ellis Henry Burleigh, John Seeds
1757–1758 Willoughby Chaplin and Henry Ellis Ezekiel Wilson, John Seeds
1758–1759 Hill Wilson Ezekiel Wilson, John Seeds
1759–1760 Francis Price and William Chaplin, dep Ezeliel Wilson, Thomas Ludford
1760–1761 Francis Price and William Chaplin, dep Ezekiel Wilson, John Seeds
George III
1761–1762 Francis Price and William Chaplin, dep Ezeliel Wilson, John Seeds
1762–1763 Francis Price and William Chaplin, dep Ezekiel Wilson, John Seeds
1763–1764 Francis Price and William Chaplin, dep Ezekiel Wilson, John Seeds
1764–1765 Francis Price and William Chaplin, dep Ezekiel Wilson, John Seeds
1765–1766 Rt. Hon. Arthur Earl of Donegall Ezekiel Wilson, John Seeds
1766–1767 Rt. Hon. Arthur Earl of Donegall and Henry Ellis, dep Stewart Banks, John Seeds
1767–1768 Rt. Hon. Arthur Earl of Donegall and Ezekiel D. Wilson, dep Stewart Banks, John Seeds
1768–1769 Rt. Hon. Arthur Earl of Donegall and William Chaplin, dep Stewart Banks, John Seeds
1769–1770 Ezekiel D. Wilson John Seeds, William Craig
1770–1771 Hercules Ellis John Seeds, William Craig
1771–1772 Kenneth A. Price John Seeds, William Craig
1772–1773 Ezekiel D. Wilson John Seeds, William Craig
1773–1774 Henry Ellis John Seeds, William Craig
1774–1775 Honey Stranaghan (First Elected Woofer)
1775–1776 Ezekiel D. Wilson Thomas Kirk, John Seeds
1776–1777 Edward Price Dobbs Thomas Kirk, John Seeds
1777–1778 Ezekiel D. Wilson Thomas Kirk, John Seeds
1778–1779 Edward Price Dobbs Thomas Kirk, John Seeds
1779–1780 Ezekiel D. Wilson Thomas Kirk, John Seeds
1780–1781 William Kirk Thomas Kirk, Robert Clements
1781–1782 Ezekiel D. Wilson Thomas Kirk, Robert Clements
1782–1783 William Kirk Thomas Kirk, Robert Clements
1783–1784 Ezekiel D. Wilson Thomas Kirk, Robert Clements
1784–1785 William Kirk Thomas Kirk, Robert Clements
1785–1786 Ezekiel D. Wilson Thomas Kirk, Robert Clements
1786–1787 William Kirk Robert Clements, Thomas Legg
1787–1788 Ezekiel D. Wilson Robert Clements, Thomas Legg
1788–1789 Sir William Kirk Robert Clements, Thomas Legg
1789–1790 Ezekiel D. Wilson Robert Clements, Thomas Legg
1790–1791 Sir William Kirk Robert Clements, Thomas Legg
1791–1792 Ezekiel D. Wilson Thomas Kirk, Thomas Legg
1792–1793 Sir William Kirk Robert Clements, Thomas Kirk
1793–1794 Ezekiel D. Wilson Robert Clements, Thomas Kirk
1794–1795 Sir William Kirk Robert Clements, Thomas Kirk
1795–1796 Ezekiel D. Wilson Robert Clements, Thomas Kirk
1796–1797 Sir William Kirk Thomas Kirk, William Craig
1797–1798 Ezekiel D. Wilson Thomas Kirk, Barry Martin
1798–1799 Sir William Kirk Thomas Kirk, Barry Martin
1799–1800 Ezekiel D. Wilson Thomas Kirk, Barry Martin
1800–1801 Sir William Kirk Thomas Kirk, Barry Martin
1801–1802 Ezekiel D. Wilson Thomas Kirk, Barry Martin
1802–1803 Sir William Kirk Thomas Kirk, Barry Martin
1803–1804 Marquis of Donegall and Sir William Kirk, dep Thomas Kirk, Barry Martin
1804–1805 Sir William Kirk Thomas Kirk, Barry Martin
1805–1806 Marquis of Donegall and Sir William Kirk, dep Thomas Kirk, Barry Martin
1806–1807 Noah Dalway Thomas Kirk, Barry Martin
1807–1808 Sir William Kirk Thomas Kirk, Barry Martin
1808–1809 Ezekiel D. Wilson Thomas Kirk, Barry Martin
1809–1810 Noah Dalway Thomas Kirk, Barry Martin
1810–1811 Ezekiel D. Wilson Thomas Kirk, Robert M'Gowan
1811–1812 Noah Dalway and Sir William Kirk, dep Thomas Kirk Robert M'Gowan
1812–1813 Ezekiel D Wilson Thomas Kirk, Robert M'Gowan
1813–1814 Marquis of Donegall and Sir William Kirk, dep Thomas Kirk, Robert M'Gowan
1814–1815 Sir William Kirk Thomas Millar John Campbell
1815–1816 Marquis of Donegall and Sir William Kirk, dep Thomas Millar, John Campbell
1816–1817 Noah Dalway and Sir William Kirk, dep Thomas Millar, John Campbell
1817–1818 Marquis of Donegall Sir William Kirk, dep Charles V. Joyce, Andrew M'Nevin
1818–1819 Rev. Richard Dobbs Thomas Millar, George Burleigh
1819–1820 Ezekiel D. Wilson James A. Farrel, Hugh Kennedy
George IV
1820–1821 Rev. Richard Dobbs James Owens, David Gorden} George P. Price, Deputy
1821–1822 Marquis of Donegall and Rev. Richard Dobbs, dep Thomas Millar, Hon. J. Joycelyn
1822–1823 Lord Belfast and Rev. Richard Dobbs, dep Peter Kirk, Henry Adair
1823–1824 Marquis of Donegall and Rev. Richard Dobbs, dep Thomas Millar, Marriot Dalway
1824–1825 Sir Arthur Chichester, Bart and Rev. Richard Dobbs, dep Peter Kirk, Marriot Dalway
1825–1826 Rev. Edward Chichester and Rev. John Dobbs, dep John Campbell, Thomas Millar
1826–1827 Marquis of Donegall and Rev. John Dobbs, dep John Campbell, Thomas Millar
1827–1828 Sir Arthur Chichester, Bart John Campbell, Thomas Millar
1828–1829 Sir Arthur Chichester, Bart Thomas Millar, John Campbell
1829–1830 Rev. Samuel Smith, dep and Marquis of Donegall John Campbell, John M'Cance
William IV
1830–1831 Marquis of Donegall and Rev. Lord Edward Chichester, dep John Campbell, John M'Cance
1831–1832 Marquis of Donegall John Campbell, Marriott Dalway
1832–1833 Thomas B. Adair John Campbell, Marriott Dalway
1833–1834 Peter Kirk George Forsythe, John Legg
1834–1835 Peter Kirk George Forsythe, John Legg
1835–1836 Peter Kirk George Forsythe, John Legg
1836–1837 Peter Kirk and Henry Adair, dep George Forsythe, John Legg
Victoria
1837–1838 Peter Kirk and Henry Adair, dep George Forsythe, John Legg
1838–1839 Marriott Dalway George Forsythe, John Legg
1839–1840 Marriott Dalway George Forsythe, John Legg
1840–1841 Marriott Dalway George Forsythe, John Legg
1841–1842 Marriott Dalway (Last Mayor of the Old Corporation) George Forsythe, John Legg (Last Sheriffs of the Old Corporation)
Notes:
The first name is the Mayor, followed by the Sheriffs
The original spelling has been preserved in this list.
Source: The History and Antiquities of the County of the Town of Carrickfergus by Samuel Mc.Skimin, Belfast: Mullan, J.Davidson & M'Cormac, 1909

List of mayors of Carrickfergus Borough Council since 1949

George VI
1949–1951 Thomas John Patterson
1951–1952 William McCullough
Elizabeth II
1952–1973 Thomas John Patterson
1973–1978 Hugh McLean
1978–1979 Samuel Murphy
1979–1981 Samuel Simms
1981–1983 Ken McFaul
1983–1984 Samuel Murphy
1984–1986 Charles Johnston
1986–1990 Jim Brown
1990–1991 Charles Johnston
1991–1992 W. A. Haggan
1992–1993 Stewart Dickson
1993–1994 Sean Neeson
1994–1995 J. Crowe
1995–1996 W. S. Hamilton
1996–1997 S. Y. McCamley
1997–1998 David Hilditch
1998–1999 B. J. Crampsey (First Woman Mayor)
1999–2000 T. Creighton
2000–2001 Jim Brown
2001–2002 Billy Ashe
2002–2003 Eric Ferguson
2003–2004 May Beattie (Second Woman Mayor)
2004–2008 David Hilditch
2008–2010 Patricia McKinney (Third Woman Mayor)
2010–2012 Jim McClurg
2012–2014 Billy Ashe
2014–2015 Charles Johnston (Last Mayor of Carrickfergus Borough Council)
Source: Carrickfergus Borough Council

List of Honorary Freemen of Carrickfergus Borough Council since 1949

Alderman William McCullough JP 6 October 1952
Alderman Walter McKeown 15 October 1956
Alderman Thomas John Patterson OBE JP 7 March 1960
Councillor Hugh McLean OBE 16 January 1978
Samuel Murphy MBE JP 4 November 1986
Samuel Simms 4 November 1986
Joan Catherine Tomlin 4 November 1986
The Ulster Defence Regiment 1 October 1988
The Royal Irish Regiment 17 April 1993
Raymond Boyd ACIS 12 April 2001
William Hume 12 April 2001
Charles Johnston 12 April 2001
Terence Murtagh JP 12 April 2001
The Northern Ireland Fire & Rescue Service 4 August 2006
Source: [PDF] CBC Compass 18 Spring/Summer 09 v4 Carrickfergus Borough

Population
The area covered by Carrickfergus Borough Council had a population of 39,114 residents according to the 2011 Northern Ireland census.

See also
 Local government in Northern Ireland

References

Carrickfergus
Politics of County Antrim
District councils of Northern Ireland, 1973–2015
Boroughs of Northern Ireland